VfL Wolfsburg finished one place lower than the last season, but still qualified for European competition via the Intertoto Cup.

First team squad
Squad at end of season

Left club during season

Results

DFB-Pokal

Third round

Round of 16

UEFA Cup

First round

Second round

Wolfsburg won 1–0 on aggregate.

Third round

Atlético Madrid won 5–3 on aggregate.

References

Notes

VfL Wolfsburg seasons
FC Schalke 04